El rifle implacable ("The Unforgiving Rifle") is a 1965 Mexican western film directed by Miguel M. Delgado. It stars Antonio Aguilar, Flor Silvestre, Olivia Michel, Víctor Junco, Tito Junco, and Crox Alvarado. It centers on two recently orphaned sisters who hire a wrongly-accused man to help them to overcome a group of bandits.

Cast
Antonio Aguilar as Martín Peréz
Flor Silvestre as Luisa Veléz
Olivia Michel as Ana Veléz
Víctor Junco as Don Pedro
Tito Junco as Second sheriff
Crox Alvarado
Ramón Bugarini
Emilio Garibay
Ramón Valdés as Roque (as Ramon Valdes Castillo)
Manuel Alvarado as Licenciado Donisio
Carlos León as First sheriff
Victorio Blanco (uncredited)
Noé Murayama as "El Puma" (uncredited)

External links

1965 films
1965 Western (genre) films
1960s Spanish-language films
Films directed by Miguel M. Delgado
Mexican Western (genre) films
1960s Mexican films